When September Comes is a 1976 Soviet drama film directed by Edmond Keosayan.

Plot 
The film tells about an elderly and sick man named Levon Poghosyan, who goes to Moscow to congratulate his grandson with beginning of his school life. He gives joy not only to his loved ones, but also to many other people he meets on the way.

Cast 
 Armen Dzhigarkhanyan as Levon Pogosyan
 Nikolay Kryuchkov as Nikolay Nikolayevich Ivanov
 Laura Gevorkyan as Nune Kondrikova
 Vladimir Ivashov as Volodya Kondrikov
 Anton Ilyin as Levonchik
 Natalya Chernyshova as Katya (as Natasha Chernyshova)
 Ivan Ryzhov as doctor-general
 Galina Polskikh as Natalya Vasilyevna
 Mikhail Metyolkin as policeman Mikhail Mikhaylovich
 Vladimir Nosik as locksmith Gena
 Viktor Avdyushko as Yevgeny Viktorovich

References

External links 
 

1976 films
1970s Russian-language films
Soviet drama films
1976 drama films
Films directed by Edmond Keosayan

Mosfilm films